Demento may refer to:
Damien Demento, pro wrestler
Dr. Demento, American radio personality
The Japanese name for the video game Haunting Ground